Ten Acre Wood is a Local Nature Reserve (LNR) in Yeading in the London Borough of Hillingdon, which is owned by Hillingdon Council and managed by the London Wildlife Trust (LWT). It is also part of the Yeading Brook Meadows Site of Metropolitan Importance for Nature Conservation (SINC), which includes two neighbouring LNRs managed by the LWT, Gutteridge Wood and Meadows and Yeading Brook Meadows LNR.

The site is composed of two areas of woodland adjoining at one corner. It is a hundred year old oak plantation with an underlayer of hawthorn and blackthorn. Yeading Brook runs through the wood, and it has areas of marsh and meadow. Birds include hobbies and kingfishers, and there are invertebrates such as Roesel's bush crickets, long winged coneheads and gatekeeper butterflies.

The site adjoins Yeading Brook Meadows to the south across Charville Lane and the Golden Bridge across the brook. In the north of the wood a footpath leads west across the brook to Gutteridge Wood and Meadows.

Notes

References

Nature reserves in the London Borough of Hillingdon
Local nature reserves in Greater London
London Wildlife Trust